William Middleton may refer to:

Politicians
 William Middleton (by 1533–74 or later), MP for Carlisle
 Sir William Middleton, 3rd Baronet, British Member of Parliament for Northumberland, 1722–1757
 Sir William Middleton, 5th Baronet, British Member of Parliament for Northumberland, 1774–1795
 Sir William Fowle Middleton, 1st Baronet (1748–1829), British Member of Parliament for Ipswich and Hastings

Others
 William Middleton (bishop) (died 1288), medieval bishop of Norwich
 William Middleton (pamphleteer) (died 1613), English churchman, academic and Protestant controversialist
 George "Bay" Middleton (William George Middleton, 1846–1892), equerry to John Spencer, 5th Earl Spencer
 William Shainline Middleton (1890–1975), American internist
 William James Middleton (1897–1918), World War I flying ace
 William D. Middleton (1928–2011), author, reporter and photographer
 William Middleton (American football) (born 1986), American football cornerback 
 William Middleton (journalist, writer), journalist and writer
 Billy Middleton (1893–?), English football forward